In a Mellow Tone is a 1989 studio album by Anita O'Day.

Track listing
"In a Mellow Tone" (Duke Ellington, Milt Gabler) – 4:20
"On the Trail" (Harold Adamson, Ferde Grofé) – 3:43
"The Man with a Horn" (Eddie DeLange, Jack Jenney, Bonnie Lake) – 3:24
"Once in a While" (Michael Edwards, Bud Green) – 3:48
"A Sleepin' Bee" (Harold Arlen, Truman Capote) – 5:04
"I Cried for You" (Gus Arnheim, Arthur Freed, Abe Lyman) – 5:48
"No Moon at All" (Redd Evans, Dave Mann) – 2:52
"Anita's Blues" (Anita O'Day) – 3:45
"Gee, Baby, Ain't I Good to You" (Andy Razaf, Don Redman) – 4:00
"Like Someone in Love" (Johnny Burke, Jimmy Van Heusen) – 3:48
"More Than You Know" (Edward Eliscu, Billy Rose, Vincent Youmans) – 5:30
"Lover, Come Back to Me" (Oscar Hammerstein II, Sigmund Romberg) – 4:55

Personnel
Anita O'Day - vocals
Pete Jolly - piano
Corky Hale - harp
Brian Bromberg - double bass
Frank Capp - drums
David Black - percussion
Gordon Brisker - synthesizer, flute, arranger, conductor, saxophone

References

1989 albums
Anita O'Day albums
Covers albums